In cryptography, a key-agreement protocol is a protocol whereby two or more parties can agree on a key in such a way that both influence the outcome. If properly done, this precludes undesired third parties from forcing a key choice on the agreeing parties. Protocols that are useful in practice also do not reveal to any eavesdropping party what key has been agreed upon.

Many key exchange systems have one party generate the key, and simply send that key to the other party—the other party has no influence on the key.
Using a key-agreement protocol avoids some of the key distribution problems associated with such systems.

Protocols where both parties influence the final derived key are the only way to implement perfect forward secrecy.

Exponential key exchange
The first publicly known public-key agreement protocol that meets the above criteria was the Diffie–Hellman key exchange, in which two parties jointly exponentiate a generator with random numbers, in such a way that an eavesdropper cannot feasibly determine what the resultant value used to produce a shared key is.

Exponential key exchange in and of itself does not specify any prior agreement or subsequent authentication between the participants.  It has thus been described as an anonymous key agreement protocol.

Authentication

Anonymous key exchange, like Diffie–Hellman, does not provide authentication of the parties, and is thus vulnerable to man-in-the-middle attacks.

A wide variety of cryptographic authentication schemes and protocols have been developed to provide authenticated key agreement to prevent man-in-the-middle and related attacks. These methods generally mathematically bind the agreed key to other agreed-upon data, such as the following:
 Public/private key pairs
 Shared secret keys
 Passwords

Public keys
A widely used mechanism for defeating such attacks is the use of digitally signed keys that must be integrity-assured: if Bob's key is signed by a trusted third party vouching for his identity, Alice can have considerable confidence that a signed key she receives is not an attempt to intercept by Eve. When Alice and Bob have a public-key infrastructure, they may digitally sign an agreed Diffie–Hellman key, or exchanged Diffie–Hellman public keys. Such signed keys, sometimes signed by a certificate authority, are one of the primary mechanisms used for secure web traffic (including HTTPS, SSL or Transport Layer Security protocols). Other specific examples are MQV, YAK and the ISAKMP component of the IPsec protocol suite for securing Internet Protocol communications. However, these systems require care in endorsing the match between identity information and public keys by certificate authorities in order to work properly.

Hybrid systems
Hybrid systems use public-key cryptography to exchange secret keys, which are then used in a symmetric-key cryptography systems. Most practical applications of cryptography use a combination of cryptographic functions to implement an overall system that provides all of the four desirable features of secure communications (confidentiality, integrity, authentication, and non-repudiation).

Passwords
Password-authenticated key agreement protocols require the separate establishment of a password (which may be smaller than a key) in a manner that is both private and integrity-assured. These are designed to resist man-in-the-middle and other active attacks on the password and the established keys. For example, DH-EKE, SPEKE, and SRP are password-authenticated variations of Diffie–Hellman.

Other tricks
If one has an integrity-assured way to verify a shared key over a public channel, one may engage in a Diffie–Hellman key exchange to derive a short-term shared key, and then subsequently authenticate that the keys match. One way is to use a voice-authenticated read-out of the key, as in PGPfone. Voice authentication, however, presumes that it is infeasible for a man-in-the-middle to spoof one participant's voice to the other in real-time, which may be an undesirable assumption. Such protocols may be designed to work with even a small public value, such as a password. Variations on this theme have been proposed for Bluetooth pairing protocols.

In an attempt to avoid using any additional out-of-band authentication factors, Davies and Price proposed the use of the interlock protocol of Ron Rivest and Adi Shamir, which has been subject to both attack and subsequent refinement.

Shared secret keys
Secret-key (symmetric) cryptography requires the initial exchange of a shared key in a manner that is private and integrity-assured. When done right, man-in-the-middle attack is prevented. However, without the use of public-key cryptography, one may be left with undesirable key-management problems.

See also
 Key (cryptography)
 Computer security
 Cryptanalysis
 Secure channel
 Digital signature
 Key encapsulation
 Key management
 Password-authenticated key agreement
 Interlock Protocol
 Zero-knowledge password proof
 Neural cryptography#Neural key exchange protocol
 Quantum key distribution

References

Cryptography